Saint Paternus was the Bishop of Auch, although born a Basque.

References

Saints from Hispania
Gallo-Roman saints
2nd-century Christian saints
2nd-century bishops in Gaul
150 deaths
Year of birth unknown